Sabin is the surname of the following people
 Albert Sabin (1906–1993), Polish-American medical researcher who developed an oral polio vaccine; President of the Weizmann Institute of Science 
Alvah Sabin (1793–1885), American politician
Alec Sabin (born 1947), British actor
Alfred Sabin (1905–1982), English football player 
Andrew Sabin (born 1958), British sculptor
Arthur Knowles Sabin (1879–1959), British writer, poet and printer
Cédric Sabin (born 1979), French football forward 
Chauncey Brewer Sabin (1824–1890), United States federal judge
 Chris Sabin (born 1982), American professional wrestler
Daniel Sabin, American engineer
Diane Sabin (born 1952), American feminist activist
Dmitry Sabin  (born 1979), Ukrainian sprint canoer 
 Dwight M. Sabin (1843–1902), American politician
E. Rose Sabin, American author of fantasy and science fiction novels
Edwin L. Sabin (1870–1952), American author of boys adventure stories
Ellen Clara Sabin (1850–1949), American educator
Éric Sabin (born 1974), French football player
 Florence R. Sabin (1871–1953), American medical scientist
 George Myron Sabin (1833–1890), American jurist
Henry Sabin (1829–1918), American educator
Hib Sabin (born 1935), American sculptor and educator
Ibn Sab'in, a Sufi philosopher
 Joseph Sabin (1821–1881), bibliographer
Mike Sabin (born 1968), New Zealand police officer, drug educator and politician
 Oliver Sabin (born 1991), Scottish electronic music/chip music composer known as Unicorn Kid
 Pauline Sabin (1887–1955), American founder of the Women's Organization for National Prohibition Reform
Philip Sabin, British military historian
Portia Sabin, American music industry executive
Roger Sabin, English writer
Wallace Arthur Sabin (1869–1937), American composer and organist
Warwick Sabin, American publisher
Wayne Sabin (1915–1989), American tennis player
William Warren Sabin (1861–1939), American architect

See also
Sabine (surname)